Pol Bueso Paradís (born 27 April 1985 in Moncofa, Province of Castellón, Valencian Community) is a Spanish professional footballer who plays as a centre-back for CD Arenteiro.

Career statistics

Club

References

External links

1985 births
Living people
People from Plana Baixa
Sportspeople from the Province of Castellón
Spanish footballers
Footballers from the Valencian Community
Association football defenders
Segunda División players
Segunda División B players
Tercera División players
Segunda Federación players
CD Castellón footballers
AD Ceuta footballers
Valencia CF Mestalla footballers
UD Salamanca players
Albacete Balompié players
Gimnàstic de Tarragona footballers
UCAM Murcia CF players
Hércules CF players
Pontevedra CF footballers